Sharifabad (also Romanized as Sharīfābād) is a village in Qatur Rural District, Qatur District, Khoy County, West Azerbaijan Province, Iran. At the 2006 census, its population was 70, in 17 families.

References 

Populated places in Khoy County